Is a Japanese gravure idol who is represented by the talent agency, Stardust Promotion, then Arimax, and later Fitone. She finished from Hiroshima Prefectural Fukuyama Reed Positive High School.

Biography
After finishing from high school, Sugihara moved to Tokyo. Thinking of how she could use her low height and her high voice, she decided to give gravure a go.

Sugihara likes Thailand, and her skill is capoeira. She is left-handed. Sugihara has gastroptosis. She has been successful several times in the stock investment, in 2014, she obtained the heading Zai Tech Tarento.

In 2012, Sugihara was appointed as a secretary of Hiroshima Prefecture tourism.

Filmography

Variety

Drama

Films

References

External links 

 
 
 Official profile 
  

Japanese gravure idols
Japanese television personalities
1982 births
Living people
Models from Hiroshima Prefecture
Former Stardust Promotion artists
Japanese actresses